David Samuel Snedden (1868–1951) was an American educator. The first Commissioner of education in Massachusetts, he left the position to serve on the faculty of Teachers College, Columbia University (1916-1935). Snedden was a pioneer in the field of educational sociology and the social efficiency movement, which promoted vocational education.

Snedden was born on a farm in Kavilah, California before attending St. Vincent's College in Los Angeles.

References

1868 births
1951 deaths
State superintendents of public instruction of the United States
Teachers College, Columbia University faculty
Loyola Marymount University alumni
Educators from California